Scio may refer to:

Places
 Chios (Genoese: Scio), a Greek island in the Aegean Sea

United States
 Scio, New York, a town
 Scio (CDP), New York, the primary settlement in the town
 Scio, Ohio
 Scio, Oregon
 Scio Township, Michigan
 Scio, Michigan, an unincorporated community

Other uses
 Science Olympiad, an American elementary, middle, and high school team competition that focuses on various science topics and engineering ability
 State Council Information Office